John Pinchon (born after 1510 – 29 November 1573), of Writtle, Essex, was a Member of Parliament (MP) for Dover in 1571.

References

16th-century births
1573 deaths
Members of the Parliament of England for Dover
People from Writtle
English MPs 1571